Autcraft is a Minecraft server dedicated to be a safe haven for children who are neurodiverse or have a diagnosis of autism.

History 
Founded in 2013, Autcraft was the first Minecraft server created with neurodiversity in mind. It was founded by Stuart Duncan, a web developer in Timmins, Canada whose son is diagnosed with autism, and is known in-game as AutismFather. Autcraft was created so such children could play their favourite game with others without facing the threat of bullying and discrimination. Autcraft is administrated by adults with and without neurodiversities as well as their friends or family. As of May 2017, the server has 8,000 unique players.

When asked about the server, Duncan stated, "We just let them know that they're not alone... We're here for each other and will support each other for as long as need be... We all know how terrible it can feel sometimes and none of us want the others to feel that same way."

References 

Minecraft servers
Internet properties established in 2013
Sociological and cultural aspects of autism